"Maneuvers" is the 27th episode of Star Trek: Voyager, and the 11th episode in the second season. In this science fiction television show, the spacecraft USS Voyager encounters the Kazon and former crew member that defected, Seska. The episode features many scenes with Chakotay, Seska, and various guest stars in the role of the Kazon. It also features several special effect sequences with various spacecraft.

Martha Hackett guest stars as Seska, returning to reprise that character, and she plays opposite Anthony De Longis cast as the Kazon sect leader First Maj Culluh. Voyager regular First Officer/Maquis leader Chakotay is played by Robert Beltran.

The episode aired on UPN on November 20, 1995.

Summary
"Maneuvers" is a science fiction television show episode that was first broadcast on UPN Network on November 20, 1995. This follows the story of starship Voyager, which after departing Deep Space Nine was taken to the other side of the Galaxy. There they encountered aliens known as the Kazon. One of their crew members, a Maquis, turned out to be a Cardassian spy and defected to the Kazon. Her name was Seska, and plot of this episode involves Seska and the Kazon's dealings with Voyager, commanded by Janeway.

This continues the story that began with "State of Flux" and this story is continued in "Basics (Part I and Part II)" (the two-part episode bridging season 2 and 3).

"Maneuvers" was written by Kenneth Biller and directed by David Livingston. David Livingston directed many Star Trek episodes in this era, including for Star Trek: The Next Generation (1987-1994), Star Trek: Deep Space Nine (1993-1999), Star Trek: Voyager, and Enterprise. Overall he directed 62 episodes of Star Trek, including 28 for Voyager.

Plot

After Voyager detects a Federation probe, the bridge-crew wonder if Starfleet has been looking for them. After setting a course for the beacon, they find it in an ion cloud and grow suspicious. Then, the Kazon Nistrim attack, matching their beams with the shield-harmonics of Voyager. The Kazon send a small craft which rams and punctures the hull of Voyager, enabling them to steal one of Voyager's transporter technology-modules, with a distraction in the cargo-bay. The shuttle causes a destabilized warp-field. To prevent the Kazon from escaping, a tractor-beam locks on and Maj Culluh hails them. It turns out that Seska, returning to her Cardassian form, has allied with Culluh and is helping the Kazon upgrade their technology to rival Voyager and dominate the quadrant. Seska calls Chakotay predictable and causes a feedback-loop which breaks the tractor-beam entirely. Voyager, unable to sustain a stable warp-field, cannot pursue. The crew plan on removing the craft before going anywhere. Janeway explains the ramifications of allowing Federation technology to be in the hands of the Kazon, and what might happen to the quadrant. Chakotay interprets this as a personal attack to lure Voyager into another trap for the rest of the ship's bounty of technology for the Kazon.

Meanwhile, on the Kazon Nistrim ship, Culluh attempts to unite the other sects by "sharing" Voyager'''s technology, starting with the transporter. On Voyager, Torres and Chakotay plan on beaming the transporter technology over; or, in a worst case scenario, destroy the module. Torres notes Chakotay taking this personally, because of how she could easily infiltrate the Maquis. Torres points out that everyone was manipulated, and that he should stay focused. Back on the Kazon vessel, Culluh and the Reloran Maj are finding it hard to unite to take Voyager. Seska offers for the Reloran Maj to return to his ship as they consider the offer, only to later test the transporter on him and his companion. Voyager later finds two of the Reloran Kazons floating in space. The cadavers of the dead Kazon are revealed to have been beamed into space alive. Neelix points out that the Relora are sworn enemies of the Nistrim. Janeway calls a senior-staff meeting, only for Chakotay to have left the ship. He disobeys protocol by taking a shuttle-craft without Janeway's permission. He also has taken the Coil Scanner - the device which will lock a beam onto the transporter-module. On the Nistrim vessel, Seska apologizes to Culluh for not being able to convince the Relora and the futile negotiating.  She reassures him, however, that the technology can prove that the Nistrim will soon conquer all the sects, becoming the most powerful Kazon sect in the quadrant.

In Janeway's ready-room, Torres defends Chakotay's actions by explaining the embarrassment of Seska's betrayal and insulting return. Chakotay meanwhile, tries to sneak up on the Kazon ship, but Seska sees him and he is captured by the Kazon. Yet before he is caught, he sends a beacon to Voyager, and transports to Seska's location and destroys the transporter on the Kazon vessel. He holds Seska at phaser-point, but hands it to her. Voyager receives the signal. After putting Chakotay in the Kazon brig to save the crew from more trouble, Seska interrogates him. She states that even though the transporter was destroyed, the shuttle could be reverse-engineered; however, Chakotay informs her that he wiped the computer-core before boarding. Seska keeps Chakotay alive for Voyager's command-codes, but gets nothing from him. Culluh attempts to force the codes out of Chakotay, but to no avail. Later, Chakotay taunts Culluh with talk of how he and Seska once had a relationship. Culluh's men inject him with a truth-serum, but Chakotay says Seska will kill Culluh when she is done with him.Voyager finds the Nistrim vessel and is surrounded by six other ships, with the possibility of uniting with other sects. Torres puts forth the idea of a transwarp-beaming to save Chakotay, which she has once before performed. Back on the Nistrim vessel, Culluh calls a meeting with other sect-leaders and states that he has the Voyager's command-codes. To prove it, he brings in Chakotay. Torres begins the procedure to rescue Chakotay as Voyager battles the Nistrim. During the battle, Torres beams out Chakotay, but Seska tries to stop them by re-modulating. Janeway then has the sect-leaders beamed on board and negotiates terms with them: return Chakotay and the shuttle in exchange for their freedom. They agree and Janeway scolds Chakotay for his reckless decision; as First Officer, he must set an example for the crew. His settling a personal score shows insubordination and made Janeway's job as Captain harder. Seska contacts Voyager telling Chakotay that she extracted some of his DNA while he was prisoner and is now pregnant with his child (starting a narrative which leads up to the events of Basics).

Reception
This had a Nielsen rating of 5.4 points when it was broadcast in 1995.Doux Reviews'' gave "Maneuvers" 2.5 out of 4.
Tor.com rated it 4 out of 10.

Sources

External links
 

Star Trek: Voyager (season 2) episodes
1995 American television episodes
Television episodes directed by David Livingston